The Encyclopaedia of the Philosophical Sciences (abbreviated as EPS or simply Encyclopaedia; , EPW, translated as Encyclopedia of the Philosophical Sciences in Basic Outline) by Georg Wilhelm Friedrich Hegel (first published in 1817, second edition 1827, third edition 1830), is a work that presents an abbreviated version of Hegel's systematic philosophy in its entirety, and is the only form in which Hegel ever published his entire mature philosophical system. The fact that the account is exhaustive, that the grounding structures of reality are ideal, and that the system is closed makes the Encyclopedia a statement par excellence of absolute idealism.

Intended as a pedagogical aid for attendees of his lectures, Hegel revised and extended the Encyclopedia over more than a decade, but stressed its role as a "textbook" in need of elucidation through oral commentary. The 1830 text is widely available in various English translations with copious additions (Zusätze) added posthumously by Hegel's students, deriving from their lecture notes. These additions expand on the text with examples and illustrations, and while scholars do not take the Zusätze to be verbatim transcription of Hegel's lectures, their more informal and non-technical style make them good stand-ins for the "necessary oral commentary".

Part I of the work is sometimes referred to as the Lesser Logic (or Shorter Logic) to distinguish it from the Greater Logic, the moniker given to Hegel's Science of Logic.

Structure 
The Encyclopedia has three main parts, each of which is further subdivided, which together purport to cover all the fundamental aspects of reality, and form a closed systematic unity.
 Science of Logic 
 Being
 Essence
 Concept (Begriff, or notion)
 Science of Nature
 Mechanics
 Physics
 Organics
 Science of Geist
 Subjective
 Objective
 Absolute Spirit
Hegel is careful to methodically derive each category of reality ('thought-determination') from its predecessor notion, with the completed system bringing the circle to a close, demonstrating its unity.

Overview
The work describes the pattern of the Idea as manifesting itself in dialectical reasoning.

While some believe that the philosophy of nature and mind are applications of the logic, this is a misunderstanding. The purpose of the Encyclopedia is descriptive: to describe how the idea (or reason) develops itself and not to apply the dialectical method to all areas of human knowledge, but the Idea is in process of growing, like a seed growing into a mature tree: it passes through stages. The first stage of the idea's development is described in the Logic. Thus the Logic presents the categories of thought as they are in themselves; they are the minimal conditions for thinking anything at all, the conceptions that run in the background of all our thinking. For Hegel, unlike Kant, reason is not just "for us", but rather it is immanent within being. The rational alone is real, and is the substrate of all things. In order to get at what a thing is, we must think about it. No amount of observing will bring us to the essence of things. Thinking and being are equivalent, and so logic and metaphysics are equivalent as well. 

As the idea works itself out more fully, it reaches the point where it simply cannot remain as it is; it is incomplete, and therefore it "others" itself; this is where the philosophy of nature emerges. When this stage of its development is completed, the idea "returns" to itself, which is the emergence of the philosophy of mind, or Geist, out of nature. Spirit is reason become self-conscious of itself as reason.  

Hegel coined the term "diamond net" in the book.  He said, “the entire range of the universal determinations of thought… into which everything is brought and thereby first made intelligible.” In other words, the diamond net of which Hegel speaks are the logical categories according to which we understand our experience, thus making our empirical observations intelligible.

English translations
English translations of all three parts are available from Oxford University Press (Part One: Hegel's Logic, 1975; Part Two: Hegel's Philosophy of Nature, 2004; Part Three: Hegel's Philosophy of Mind, 1970), with each part bound as a separate book.

An English translation of the first part is also available from Cambridge University Press: Encyclopedia of the Philosophical Sciences in Basic Outline, Part I: Science of Logic, translated by Klaus Brinkmann, Daniel O. Dahlstrom (Cambridge University Press, 2010).
Whewell in his "Philosophy of Discovery" translated parts of Hegel's discussion of physics. Whewell found Hegel's discussion of Newtonian gravitation to vary between unintelligible and incompetent.

Notes

Bibliography
The Encyclopaedia Logic: Part 1 of the Encyclopaedia of Philosophical Sciences, trans. T. F. Geraets, W. A. Suchting, and H. S. Harris (Indianapolis: Hackett, 1991).
Philosophy of Nature (Part Two of the Encyclopaedia of Philosophical Sciences), trans. Michael John Petry, 3 vols., (London: George Allen and Unwin, 1970).
Hegel's Philosophy of Mind: Being Part Three of the Encyclopaedia of Philosophical Sciences, trans. William Wallace (Oxford: Clarendon Press, 1971).

External links
 
 E-text of Enzyklopädie der philosophischen Wissenschaften im Grundrisse
 E-text of the Wallace Translation of Part Three of the Encyclopaedia
 Hegel's Encyclopaedia of the Philosophical Sciences in Outline

1817 non-fiction books
Works by Georg Wilhelm Friedrich Hegel
Logic literature
19th-century encyclopedias